I Wish I Knew is a 2010 Chinese documentary film directed by Jia Zhangke. It was screened as part of the Un Certain Regard section of the 2010 Cannes Film Festival.

The film features a number of people (including film director Hou Hsiao-hsien) talking about their life experiences of Shanghai, and about China's film history.

References

External links

2010 films
Chinese documentary films
Films directed by Jia Zhangke
2010 documentary films